Ovalentaria is a clade of ray-finned fishes within the Percomorpha, referred to as a subseries. It is made up of a group of fish families which are referred to in Fishes of the World's fifth edition as incertae sedis, as well as the orders Mugiliformes, Cichliformes, and Blenniiformes. It was named by W. L. Smith and T. J. Near in Wainwright et al. (2012) based on a molecular phylogeny, but the authors suggested that the group was united by the presence of demersal eggs that are attached to a substrate. Some authors have used the ordinal name Stiassnyiformes for a clade including Mugiloidei, Plesiopidae, Blenniiformes, Atherinomorpha, and Cichlidae, and this grouping does appear to be monophyletic.

Classification
In the 5th edition of Fishes of the World, the Ovalentaria are classified as:

 incertae sedis
 Family Ambassidae (Asian glassfishes)
 Family Embiotocidae (surfperches)
 Family Grammatidae (basslets)
 Family Plesiopidae (roundheads)
 Family Polycentridae (South American leaffishes)
 Family Pomacentridae (damselfishes)
 Family Pseudochromidae (dottybacks)
 Family Opistognathidae (jawfishes)
 Order Mugiliformes
 Family Mugilidae (mullets)
 Order Cichliformes
 Family Cichlidae (cichilds)
 Family Pholidichthyidae (convict blenny)
 Order Blenniiformes
 Family Tripterygiidae (triplefin blennies)
 Family Dactyloscopidae (sand stargazers)
 Family Blenniidae (combtooth blennies)
 Family Clinidae (kelp blennies)
 Family Labrisomidae (labrisomid blennies)
 Family Chaenopsidae (tube blennies)
 Order Gobiesociformes
 Family Gobiesocidae (clingfishes)
 Infraseries Atherinomorpha
 Order Atheriniformes
 Suborder Atherinopsoidei
 Family Atherinopsidae (New World silversides)
 Family Notocheiridae (surf silversides)
 Suborder Atherinoidei
 Family Isonidae (surf sardines)
 Family Melanotaeniidae (rainbowfishes and blue eyes)
 Family Atherionidae (pricklenose silversides)
 Family Dentatherinidae (Mercer's tusked silverside)
 Family Phallostethidae (priapiumfishes)
 Family Atherinidae (Old World silversides)
 Order Beloniformes
 Suborder Adrianichthyoidei
 Family Adrianichthyidae 
 Suborder Exocoetoidei
 Superfamily Exocoetoidea
 Family Exocoetidae (flying fishes)
 Family Hemiramphidae (Halfbeaks)
 Family Zenarchopteridae (viviparous halfbeaks)
 Superfamily Scomberesocoidea
 Family Belonidae (needlefishes)
 Family Scomberesocidae (sauries)
 Order Cyprinodontiformes
 Suborder Aplocheiloidei
 Family Aplocheilidae (Asian rivulines)
 Family Nothobranchiidae (African rivulines)
 Family Rivulidae (New World rivulines)
 Suborder Cyprinodontoidei
 Superfamily Funduloidea
 Family Profundulidae (Middle American killifishes)
 Family Goodeidae 
 Family Fundulidae (topminnows)
 Superfamily Valencioidea
 Family Valenciidae (Valencia toothcarps)
 Superfamily Cyprinodontoidea
 Family Cyprinodontidae (pupfishes)
 Superfamily Poecilioidea
 Family Anablepidae (four-eyed fish)
 Family Poecilidae (livebearers)

The sister clades to the Ovalentaria is the group of taxa called the Carangimorpharia or Carangaria, which includes the flatfishes, billfishes, and jacks among others.

References

 
Ray-finned fish orders
Percomorpha